Ghadir or Ghadeer means hollow or pond in Arabic. It may refer to:

Places 
Ghadir, a village in Keserwan District, Lebanon
Ghadir-e Sab, a village in Khuzestan Province, Iran
Ghadir Kuhi, a village in Hormozgan Province, Iran
Ghadir Saberi, a village in Hormozgan Province, Iran
Qaleh-ye Ghadir, a village in Khuzestan Province, Iran
Shahrak-e Ghadir, a village in Fars Province, Iran
Ghadir Bridge, a bridge in Esfahan city over the Zayandeh River, Iran
Ghadir Khumm, the location of Event of Ghadir Khumm, a sacred site in Saudi Arabia
A former village in Aden, now Yemen

People 
Ali Ghadeer (born 1971), Iraqi writer and journalist
Mohammad Ghadir (born 1991), Israeli Arab footballer
Ghadir Ghroof-Gharid (born 1990), Palestinian track and field athlete
Ghadir Razuki (fl. 1983–2000), British-Iraqi businessman

Other uses 
Ghadir (missile), an Iranian anti-ship cruise missile
Ghadir (submarine), a class of midget submarines built by Iran
Ghadir River, a river in Lebanon
Al-Ghadir, a book by Iranian Shia scholar Abd Al Husayn Amini
Eid al-Ghadeer, a festival commemorating Muhammad's last sermon
Event of Ghadir Khumm, where Muhammad announced Ali as his successor